pbar may refer to:
 picobar, a unit of pressure